John Beatty may refer to:

John Beatty (Continental Congress) (1749–1826), American Revolutionary War officer, delegate to Continental Congress, New Jersey congressman
John Beatty (Ohio banker) (1828–1914), U.S. Congressman, Civil War Union general
John Beatty (philosopher) (born 1951), University of British Columbia philosopher of biology
John Beatty (illustrator) (born 1961), American comics illustrator
John Lee Beatty, American scenic designer
J. W. Beatty (John William Beatty, 1869–1941), Canadian painter
John Louis Beatty (1922–1975), American writer and professor
John K. Beatty (1821–?), Irish uillean piper

See also
John Beattie (disambiguation)